Margaret Anne King (10 April 1939 – 5 March 2020) was a Welsh born Australian actress, active in stage, television and film roles. She is probably best known for her AFI-nominated role in The Big Steal.
 
King was born in Wales, United Kingdom, and was the younger sister of English-Australian actress Joan Sydney. whom she often acted alongside, primarily on stage. She retired in 2010.

Filmography

Film

Television

References

External links

Australian film actresses
Australian television actresses
1939 births
2020 deaths